Old Miakka (or Old Myakka) is a census-designated place in Sarasota County, Florida, United States. It is located at the bend of County Road 780, where it changes from running north–south to east–west. The community is part of the North Port–Sarasota–Bradenton, Florida Metropolitan Statistical Area.

History
The cornerstone is the Old Miakka United Methodist Church which was built in 1886. This is also where the historic marker is located. The area was named after what the Seminole tribe called the Miarca River. The name Miakka first appeared on maps in 1845.

Spelling
A letter was written in 1940 by Secretary W. Stanley Hanson of the Seminole Indian Association to Project Superintendent Claude E. Ragan of the newly formed Myakka River State Park used the spelling of “Miakka River State Park.” The letter explains Hanson's attempt to discover the history and origin of the various spellings. He stated Lake Myakka was labeled as “Mayaco” on some early maps. The letter also notes the origin of the word “Miami”, as “Mayaca” is conjectured by some to have the same meaning. The “Mayaimi” Tribe lived near Lake Okeechobee, named from the Hitchiti words oki (water) and chubi (big). The oldest known name for Lake Okeechobee was “Mayaimi,” (also meaning big water) as reported by Hernando de Escalante Fontaneda in the 16th century.

The United States Board on Geographic Names (BGN) ruled in December 1943 on the usage of "Old Myakka" for the spelling of the geographical name as it was "both officially and locally preferred to help distinguish it from Myakka City and vice versa." The ruling acknowledged the spelling Miakka to be found on various official documents such as the USGS state maps, Rand McNally Atlas, and Official State Road Map.

References

Sarasota metropolitan area
Census-designated places in Sarasota County, Florida